In the Parliament of the United Kingdom, Members of Parliament (MPs) can be suspended from sitting in the House of Commons by the Speaker for "disorderly conduct".
The Speaker can order an MP removed from the house until the end of the day, but more often "names" an MP.

When an MP is named, a vote is held in the house in the same way as a normal vote on legislation. If the vote is successful, the MP named is suspended for five days for a first offence and 20 days for a second offence, during which time they cannot take part in votes and debates in Parliament. They also have their pay suspended.

Short exclusions are typically given for conduct within the chamber, including conduct intended as forms of protest—several short suspensions listed below involve interfering with the ceremonial mace. The Commons Select Committee on Standards and the Independent Expert Panel are empowered to investigate more serious misconduct and can recommend suspensions. Such suspensions of at least 10 sitting days and/or 14 calendar days trigger recall petitions under the provisions of the Recall of MPs Act 2015.

Members of the House of Lords can also be suspended. This occurred for the first time since 1642 in May 2009, when Labour peers Lord Truscott and Lord Taylor of Blackburn were suspended after a newspaper accused them of offering to change laws for cash. It was followed by the suspension of three more peers in October 2010, when Baroness Uddin, Lord Paul and Lord Bhatia were suspended following the Parliamentary expenses scandal.

List of MPs suspended from parliament

External links
 Members Suspended from the House of Commons 1949–2009

References

Parliament of the United Kingdom